The Weyerhaeuser Office Building is a building located in Everett, Washington, that was once listed on the National Register of Historic Places. The building was built in 1923. Weyerhaeuser, at the time the largest employer in Everett, commissioned architect Carl Gould to design a  building that would showcase local wood varieties such as fir, cedar, and hemlock. The building houses a two-story, concrete-and-steel, 160 ton vault that was originally used to store the company payroll.  The Gothic-style structure was erected at the company's first Everett plant, known as Mill A.

The building was first moved by barge in 1938. It was located up the Snohomish River to the company's Mill B, located near the Legion Memorial Golf Course. The structure served as an office space until the mill closed in 1979.

In 1983, the building was donated to the Port of Everett. It was relocated at the Port's south marina. The structure served as an office space for the Everett Chamber of Commerce in the 1980s.

In July 2016, the structure was relocated to Boxcar Park, located within the Esplanade District at the water's edge. The port wanted to reopen the building in 2020, but the economic impact of the COVID-19 pandemic rendered the renovation work cost-prohibitive without a private partner; the port commission eventually approved a ten-year lease with The Lokey Group, led by Whidbey Island restaurateur Jack Ng, to operate the building as a bar, coffee shop, and museum in March 2022. The renovated building, tentatively renamed The Muse, is projected to open on March 23, 2023, marking the centennial of its original opening.

See also
 National Register of Historic Places listings in Snohomish County, Washington

References

External links
 Forest History on the Move: Everett’s Wandering Weyerhaeuser Office  A history of the Weyerhaeuser Office Building from the Forest History Society

1923 establishments in Washington (state)
Gothic Revival architecture in Washington (state)
Office buildings on the National Register of Historic Places in Washington (state)
Office buildings completed in 1923
Weyerhaeuser
National Register of Historic Places in Everett, Washington
Former National Register of Historic Places in Washington (state)